The Bethune–Ayres House is a historic house located  east of Jerome, Idaho. The lava rock house has a vernacular design which features concrete lintels and windowsills and a symmetrical front facade. The house was owned by local shepherd Peter G. Bethune and was likely also owned by a Captain Ayres.

The house was added to the National Register of Historic Places on September 8, 1983.

References

Houses on the National Register of Historic Places in Idaho
Houses completed in 1920
Houses in Jerome County, Idaho
National Register of Historic Places in Jerome County, Idaho